Kirkenær is the administrative centre of Grue Municipality in Innlandet county, Norway. The village is located on the eastern shore of the river Glomma.

Grue Church is located on the south side of the village. The Norwegian National Road 2 and the Solørbanen railway line both run through the village.

History
The place is named after the Kirkenær farm and is located in the middle of Solør. 

In 1822, the Grue Church fire occurred at Grue Church which was located a little to the northwest of Kirkenær. It was a major fire catastrophe where at least 113 people perished in addition to destroying the church.

When the Solørbanen railway was completed to Kirkenær in 1893, the village rapidly grew up around the railway station.

Media gallery

References

Grue, Norway
Villages in Innlandet
Populated places on the Glomma River